Dalum may refer to:

 Dalum, Alberta
 Dalum, a district of Odense, Denmark
 Dalum, a location in Geeste, Emsland, Lower Saxony, Germany
 Dalum, Ghana, a community in Kumbungu District
 Dalum, Sweden
 Dalum IF, a Danish association football club